See Diocese of Alexandria for namesakesFormer names:  Diocese of Natchitoches (1853-1910), Diocese of Alexandria (1910-1977), Diocese of Alexandria-Shreveport (1977-1986).''

The Diocese of Alexandria in Louisiana is a Latin Church ecclesiastical territory or diocese of the Catholic Church in the state of Louisiana in the United States. Its territory spans Avoyelles, Rapides, Vernon, Natchitoches, Winn, Caldwell, Madison, Franklin, Tensas, Concordia, Catahoula, LaSalle, and Grant civil parishes, an area of 27,810 km².  As of 2014, it had a Catholic population of 42,929 (11.2% of 383,421 total) in 50 parishes with 71 priests (61 diocesan, 10 religious), 19 deacons, 43 lay religious (14 brothers, 29 sisters) and 10 seminarians. 

The Diocese of Alexandria in Louisiana's cathedral is St. Francis Xavier Cathedral in Alexandria, Louisiana. It also has a former Cathedral and Minor Basilica: the Basilica of the Immaculate Conception, in Natchitoches, Louisiana.  It is a suffragan diocese in the ecclesiastical province of the metropolitan Archdiocese of New Orleans.

History 

Antonio Margil was the first priest to minister within the territory now forming the diocese. From the Ays Indians, west of the Sabine river, Father Margil heard of the Adayes Indians, and in March, 1717, he located them near Spanish Lake, in what became Sabine Parish, Louisiana, founded the mission of San Miguel de Linares and built there probably the first church in Louisiana, for according to the historian Martin, when Pere Charlevoix reached New Orleans in 1721, he found there "about 100 cabins, two or three dwelling houses and a miserable storehouse which had been at first occupied as a chapel, a shed being now used for that purpose". Leaving Father Gusman in charge, Father Margil journeyed on foot to Natchitoches to minister to the French Catholics there, and then went back to Texas.
 
In 1718, during the brief war with Spain, Blondel, the French Commandant at Natchitoches, invaded the Adayes mission, plundered it and carried away the church vestments. Father Margil heard of it, and in 1721 came back, hunted up the Adayes who had taken refuge in the forests for fear of the French, rebuilt their church, which he dedicated to Our Lady of the Pillar, the patroness of the expedition. For many years afterward the Adayes mission was attended from San Antonio by the Franciscans, who attended also the missions of Nacogdoches and St. Augustin, Texas. In 1725 there were 50 Catholic families at Natchitoches. In 1728 Father Maximin, a Capuchin, was in charge. 

There is no record to show how the eastern portion of the diocese was evangelized, but the Catholic names given to villages and lakes contiguous to the Mississippi indicate that priests must have visited that country.  The priests probably were Jesuits, as they had charge of the Indians along the Mississippi under the Bishop of Quebec in the 18th century. The records show that in 1829 Father Martin of Avoyelles attended the Catholics on the Red, Black and Ouachita rivers; that, in 1840 and after, Father J. Timon, afterwards Bishop of Buffalo, made regular trips from Texas to attend the north Louisiana missions, and that Father O'Brien, a Dominican from Louisville, attended yearly the Catholics along the Mississippi. The Catholics located on the rivers of the state often drifted to New Orleans on barges to have their marriages blessed and their children baptized, and come back cordelling their boats. 

In 1852, the Fathers of the First Council of Baltimore recommended division of the Archdiocese of New Orleans by formation of a diocese with its see at Natchitoches and the appointment of Father Augustus Marie Martin, then the parish priest at Natchitoches, as its first bishop, to the Holy See.  Pope Pius IX granted this request, erecting the Diocese of Natchitoches on 9 July 1853 with territory taken from the Metropolitan Archdiocese of New Orleans, making it a suffragan of the same metropolitan see, and appointing Fr. Martin as its first bishop.  There were four priests in the new diocese at the time, three of whom returned to the Archdiocese of New Orleans, to which they belonged, while the fourth remained.  Bishop Martin left a collection of unpublished letters that tell the early life of his diocese, his struggles with poverty, and his many trips to France to recruit his clergy. A fluent writer, his letters to the Propagation of the Faith were inserted in the "Annals"; the bishops of the Second Council of Baltimore and those of the provincial Council of New Orleans delegated him to write letters of thanks to the directors of the Propagation of the Faith for their generous contributions. Both letters were reproduced in "Les Missions Catholiques". Bishop Martin left an organized diocese with 20 priests, the Sisters of the Sacred Heart with one convent at Natchitoches, and the Daughters of the Cross with their mother house and several convents in the diocese.  His successors saw to the construction of the Cathedral of the Immaculate Conception, no longer a cathedral but now a minor basilica, and an episcopal residence in Natchitoches.

On 6 August 1910 Pope Pius X transferred the see to Alexandria, designating St. Francis Xavier Church as the new cathedral of the transferred see, and changed the title of the diocese to Diocese of Alexandria.

On October 18, 1976, Pope Paul VI changed the title of the diocese to Diocese of Alexandria-Shreveport, officially establishing a second see in Shreveport, Louisiana, and designating the Church of St. John Berchmans in that city as the co-cathedral in that city.

On June 16, 1986, Pope John Paul II erected the Diocese of Shreveport with territory taken from the Diocese of Alexandria-Shreveport, making it a suffragan of the Archdiocese of New Orleans, and changed the title of the mother diocese back to Diocese of Alexandria.

Reports of sexual abuse 
In February 2019, the Diocese of Alexandria released the names of 27 Catholic clergy who were accused of committing sexual abuse while serving in the diocese. Two clergy on this list were convicted while three others gave financial settlements to their victims. Three more names were added to this list in June 2019. In 2013, one accused priest, Reverend Frederick James Lyons, was sentenced to a life of prayer and penance and stripped of this title of protonotary apostolic supernumerary. The name of Fr. Theodore Lelieveld, who was accused of committing sex abuse while serving in the Diocese of Alexandria in the mid-1960s and died in 1976, was added to the list in September 2019 after sex abuse allegations against him were deemed credible.

Bishops

Bishops of Natchitoches 
 Augustus Marie Martin (1853-1875)
 Francis Xavier Leray (1876-1879), appointed Coadjutor Archbishop and later Archbishop of New Orleans
 Anthony Durier (1884-1904)
 Cornelius Van de Ven (1904-1910), title changed with title of see

Bishops of Alexandria 
 Cornelius Van de Ven (1910-1932)
 Daniel Francis Desmond (1932-1945)
 Charles Pasquale Greco (1946-1973)
 Lawrence Preston Joseph Graves (1973-1976), title changed with title of see

Bishops of Alexandria-Shreveport 
 Lawrence Preston Joseph Graves (1976-1982)
 William Benedict Friend (1982-1986), appointed Bishop of Shreveport

Bishops of Alexandria 
 John C. Favalora (1986-1989), appointed Bishop of Saint Petersburg and later Archbishop of Miami
 Sam G. Jacobs (1989-2003), appointed Bishop of Houma–Thibodaux
 Ronald Paul Herzog (2004-2017)
 David Talley (2017-2019; coadjutor 2016-2017)
 Robert W. Marshall (2020-present)

Coat of arms

Catholic high schools 
 Holy Savior Menard Central High School, Alexandria
 St. Joseph High School, Plaucheville
 St. Mary's High School, Natchitoches

See also 
 namesake Roman Catholic Diocese of Alexandria-Cornwall in Ontario, Canada
 List of Catholic dioceses in the United States

References

Sources and external links
 GCatholic, with Google map and satellite photo - data for most sections
 Roman Catholic Diocese of Alexandria Official Site

 
1853 establishments in Louisiana
Religious organizations established in 1853
Roman Catholic dioceses and prelatures established in the 19th century
Roman Catholic dioceses in the United States
Roman Catholic Ecclesiastical Province of New Orleans